Suttree is a semi-autobiographical novel by Cormac McCarthy, published in 1979.  Set in Knoxville, Tennessee, over a four-year period starting in 1950, the novel follows Cornelius Suttree, who has repudiated his former life of privilege to become a fisherman on the Tennessee River. The novel has a fragmented structure with many flashbacks and shifts in grammatical person. Suttree has been compared to James Joyce's Ulysses and John Steinbeck's Cannery Row, and called "a doomed Huckleberry Finn" by Jerome Charyn. Suttree was written over a 20-year span and is a departure from McCarthy's previous novels, being much longer, more sprawling in structure, and perhaps his most humorous.

Plot summary
The novel begins with Suttree observing police as they pull a suicide victim from the river. Suttree is living alone in a houseboat, on the fringes of society on the Tennessee River, earning money by fishing for the occasional catfish. He has left a life of luxury, rejecting his parents' influence, and abandoning his wife and young son.

A large cast of characters, largely composed of misfits and grotesques, is introduced, one of which is a dimwitted young man named Gene Harrogate, whom Suttree meets during a short stint in a work camp-style prison. Harrogate was sent to prison after being caught "violating" a farmer's watermelons. Suttree attempts to help Harrogate stay out of trouble after he is released, but this task proves to be in vain as Harrogate sets off on a series of misadventures, including using poisoned meat and a slingshot to kill bats ("flitter-mice" as Harrogate calls them) to earn a bounty on them, and using dynamite in an attempt to tunnel underneath the city and burgle the treasury. Other prominent characters are prostitutes, hermits, alcoholics, and an aged Geechee witch.

His relationships with women all come to bad ends. One prostitute-girlfriend terminates the relationship in a moment of madness, smashing up the inside of their new car. He becomes involved with a teenage girl from a destitute family, but awakens in the night to find her crushed to death by a landslide that falls on their homeless encampment. Prior to the beginning of the book, Suttree was also married to a woman he apparently met at university. He left his wife with a young son, who dies of an illness early on in the book. He watches the funeral from afar, and proceeds to bury the boy alone once the other mourners leave.

Towards the novel's end, Suttree falls ill with typhoid fever and suffers a lengthy hallucination. This occurs after a black friend of Suttree is killed in a fight with the police and Harrogate is arrested in a failed robbery attempt. In the end, he feels his identity as an individual is affirmed by his time living in destitution, and he leaves Knoxville, seeking a new life.

Reception
Novelist Nelson Algren argued that the novel was "a memorable American comedy by an original storyteller." Estimable reviews by such noted writers and literary critics as Anatole Broyard, Jerome Charyn, Guy Davenport, and Shelby Foote were followed by the Times Literary Supplement review which saw the novel as "Faulknerian in its gentle wryness, and a freakish imaginative flair reminiscent of Flannery O'Connor." The influential profile writer and music journalist Stanley Booth observed that Suttree was "probably the funniest and most unbearably sad of McCarthy's books...which seem to me unsurpassed in American literature." Late in life, after losing much of his physical sensing, film critic Roger Ebert wrote, "I began to live through this desperate man's sad life."

References

External links

Charyn, J., Suttree, New York Times Book Review, Feb 1979
"Searching for Suttree", by Wes Morgan (2004); photographs of some of the Knoxville locations featured in Suttree

1979 American novels
American autobiographical novels
Novels by Cormac McCarthy
Culture of Knoxville, Tennessee
Southern United States in fiction
Tennessee River
Novels set in East Tennessee
Fiction set in 1951
Novels set in Appalachia